Pterophorus albidus is a moth of the family Pterophoridae. It is distributed in Africa, south and south-east Asia, including New Guinea and Australia, as well as Japan (Kyushu) and the Ryukyu Islands (Tokunoshima, Okinoerabujima, Okinawa).

The species is characterized by the faint yellow colour.

Larvae have been recorded feeding on Ipomoea nil.

References

External links 
 Taxonomic and Biological Studies of Pterophoridae of Japan (Lepidoptera)
 Australian Faunal Directory
 Australian Insects
 Review of the Pterophoridae from New Guinea, with descriptions of eight new species (Lepidoptera)

albidus
Moths of Australia
Moths of Africa
Moths of Japan
Moths of Madagascar
Moths of Réunion
Moths described in 1852